"Dat Dere" is a jazz song written by Bobby Timmons that was recorded in 1960. Lyrics were written later by Oscar Brown, Jr.

Recording and lyrics 
The song was first recorded by Bobby Timmons in his debut album This Here Is Bobby Timmons (January 1960), and shortly thereafter by the Cannonball Adderley Quintet on the album Them Dirty Blues (February 1960) and by Art Blakey and the Jazz Messengers on the album The Big Beat (March 1960), with Timmons as pianist on both recordings.

Oscar Brown Jr. wrote the lyrics later for his 1960 album Sin & Soul. In 1962 Sheila Jordan recorded the vocal version for her acclaimed debut record "Portrait of Sheila".  The song has since been recorded by dozens of performers in both vocal and instrumental versions, perhaps most notably by Rickie Lee Jones on her 1991 album Pop Pop.

References

1960 songs
Compositions by Bobby Timmons
Jazz songs
Songs about parenthood